Alexander Corryn (born 3 January 1994) is a Belgian professional footballer who plays as a left-back for Challenger Pro League club Beveren.

Career
Corryn joined Challenger Pro League club Beveren on 10 July 2022, signing a one-year contract. He made his debut against Beerschot on 13 August 2022.

Honours
Mechelen
 Belgian Cup: 2018–19

References

External links

1994 births
Footballers from Ghent
Living people
Belgian footballers
Association football defenders
K.S.C. Lokeren Oost-Vlaanderen players
K.V. Mechelen players
Royal Antwerp F.C. players
Cercle Brugge K.S.V. players
S.K. Beveren players
Belgian Pro League players
Challenger Pro League players
Belgium youth international footballers